Jamni River is a river in northern India. It is a main tributary of the Betwa River and enters Lalitpur District near Madanpur village. It meets Betwa river near Orchha.

External links
 Wikimapia: Jamni river meeting Betwa river
 https://www.mindat.org/feature-1269310.html

Rivers of Uttar Pradesh
Rivers of Madhya Pradesh
Rivers of India